Ethan Mahoney Watts (born May 4, 1972, in Philadelphia, Pennsylvania) is a former American volleyball player, who was a member of the United States men's national volleyball team that finished in ninth place at the 1996 Summer Olympics in Atlanta, Georgia. He competed at the 1993 World University Games in Buffalo, New York as a middle blocker, and was a member of the team that won the bronze medal at the World Championship. After playing for the U.S. national team, Watts played volleyball professionally in Italy for teams in Modena, Latina and Milan.

Watts graduated from BYU with a B.S. in psychology, and later graduated from the University of San Diego with a J.D. and M.B.A. In 2006, Watts was inducted into the BYU Athletic Hall of Fame.

Watts currently resides in San Diego, California with his wife, Manuela, where Watts practices law as a business law, IP law and real estate law attorney.

References
 Profile at The Washington Post
 Article at the Deseret News
 Italian volleyball league webpage
 Italian volleyball league webpage
 Italian volleyball league webpage
 Watts Law Offices, P.C. website

1972 births
Living people
American men's volleyball players
Brigham Young University alumni
University of San Diego alumni
Volleyball players at the 1996 Summer Olympics
Olympic volleyball players of the United States
Sportspeople from Philadelphia
Pan American Games silver medalists for the United States
Pan American Games medalists in volleyball
Volleyball players at the 1995 Pan American Games
Medalists at the 1995 Pan American Games
BYU Cougars men's volleyball players